Agathotoma castellata is a species of sea snail, a marine gastropod mollusk in the family Mangeliidae.

Description
The length of the shell attains  mm, its diameter  mm.

(Original description) The white, oblong, turreted shell contains 6 to 7 whorls, of which two in the protoconch. This is a very elegantly formed shell. The whorls are narrower at the base than above, thus producing the turreted aspect. The plicate ribs are very prominent and the penultimate on the body whorl is considerably remote from that which forms the outer lip. As they are rather produced at the upper end the whorls have a somewhat castellated appearance, and in all the four examples which I have examined they are continuous up the spire. The aperture is narrow. The siphonal canal is short and truncate.

Distribution
This species occurs in the Caribbean Sea off Guadeloupe, Aruba; Curaçao; also off the Bahamas at depths between 3 and 21 m.

References

 Rolán E., Fernández-Garcés E. & Redfern C. (2012) New records and description of four new species of the genus Agathotoma (Gastropoda, Mangeliidae) in the Caribbean. Novapex 13(2): 45-62

External links
 
 Tucker, J.K. 2004 "Catalog of recent and fossil turrids (Mollusca: Gastropoda)". Zootaxa. 682:1-1295.
 MNHN, Paris: Agathotoma castellata

castellata
Gastropods described in 1888